Amenemipet called Pairy (sometimes Amenemopet called Pairy) was a Vizier of ancient Egypt. He  served during the reign of Amenhotep II and Tuthmosis IV.

Family
Amenemipet called Pairy was the son of Ahmose Humay and Nub. He was the cousin of Sennefer, who is shown in Amenemipet's Theban tomb together with Sennefer's wife Senetnay. Amenemipet had at least one son named Paser, who is depicted in his Theban tomb.

Tombs and burial
Amenemipet called Pairy has a tomb chapel in TT29 in Abd el Qurna in Thebes. His actual tomb was found in the Valley of the Kings. Tomb KV48 is an undecorated tomb in the western branch of the southwest wadi. It is located near KV35, the tomb of Amenhotep II whom Amenemipet served. The tomb contained among others some shabtis belonging to Amenemipet.

References

Viziers of the Eighteenth Dynasty of Egypt